Helmut Roleder (born 9 October 1953) is a retired German footballer who played as a goalkeeper.

Club career 
He spent 13 seasons in the Bundesliga with VfB Stuttgart. In 1983–84 Roleder won the West German football championship.

International career 
He earned one cap as a substitute for the West German national team in 1984 in a friendly against the Soviet Union. Roleder was included in the DFB squad for the 1984 UEFA European Football Championship, however he didn't play.

Honours

Club
VfB Stuttgart
 Bundesliga: winner 1983–84; runner-up: 1978–79
 DFB-Pokal: runner-up 1985–86

References

External links
 
 
 

1953 births
Living people
People from Freital
People from Bezirk Dresden
German footballers
Footballers from Saxony
Germany international footballers
Germany B international footballers
Association football goalkeepers
UEFA Euro 1984 players
VfB Stuttgart players
Bundesliga players
2. Bundesliga players